Roy Joseph Patrick Norman (1885-1967) was an Australian rugby league player who played in the 1910s.

Playing career
Norman was one of four brothers who turned out for four Sydney based rugby league teams in the foundation years of the NSWRFL. The elder brother of Bernard, Ray and Rex, Norman played rugby league until he turned 31 in 1916. Norman also made one appearance for New South Wales team in 1910.

Death
Norman died on 7 July 1967, aged 82.

References

1885 births
1967 deaths
Annandale rugby league players
Glebe rugby league players
Western Suburbs Magpies players
New South Wales rugby league team players
Australian rugby league players
Rugby league centres
Rugby league wingers
Date of birth missing
Rugby league players from Sydney